In Jainism, Samavasarana or Samosharana ("Refuge to All") is the divine preaching hall of the Tirthankara, stated to have more than 20,000 stairs in it. The word samavasarana is derived from two words, sama, meaning general and avasara, meaning opportunity. It is an important feature in Jain art. The Samavasarana seems to have replaced the original Jain stupa as an object of worship.

Samavasarana 

In samavasarana, the tirthankara sits on a throne without touching it (about two inches above it). Around the tirthankara sit the ganadharvas (chief disciples). Living beings sit in the following order:
In the first hall, ascetics
In the second hall, one class of deva ladies
In the third hall, aryikas (nuns) and laywomen
In the next three halls, three other classes of deva ladies
In the next four halls, the four classes of devas (heavenly beings)
Men, in the eleventh hall
Animals, in the last hall

According to Jain texts, there would be four wide roads with four huge columns, Manasthamba (literally, pride pillar), one in each side. The total size of the hall varies depending upon the height of the people in that era.

Effects 

In samavasarana, a tirthankara sits facing the east, but appears to be looking in all directions. Tirthankara sits on a soft cushion while preaching the Jain philosophy in plain terms. All humans and animals can understand the discourse. Jain scriptures say that all creatures who listen would become less violent and less greedy. The speech of the tirthankara is distinctly heard by every one present.

Gallery

See also
God in Jainism

References

Citation

Source

Further reading

External links

Article with Picture of Samavasarana
Samavasarana in Detail

Jain philosophical concepts
Jain belief and doctrine